The International Art Books and Films Festival  (in French, Festival International du Livre d'Art et du Film) or FILAF, is an international festival about artbooks and films which takes place annually in Perpignan (South of France) since 2011. Its goal is to promote and award the best books and films about art produced each year in the world.

History and goals 

Noting the world absence of a real event only focused on art books, and similarly on the field of art films, the Cogito Organization and its president Sébastien Planas created the International Artbooks and Films Festival in Perpignan. The first edition took place in June 2011

The aim of the festival is to present to the general public a selection of the best books and films on art published or produced during the past year on an international scale. Authors, editors, directors, producers and selected artists are invited to Perpignan to present their work. A week of conferences, screenings, readings, signatures, workshops for children, professional round tables, thematic evenings, allows the world of art to meet and present its most important productions.

The FILAF festival relies on a scientific professional committee, recognized in each of their disciplines, responsible for selection throughout the year. It also mobilizes an annually renewed jury which, at the end of the festival, awards the Gold FILAF, the Silver FILAF and the Special Jury Prize (categories "book" and « film »).

In 2016, the FILAF festival created a new prize in collaboration with French Art Fair Galeristes, to reward the best art book published by an art gallery.

Scientific committee 

From 2011 to 2016

 Xavier Canonne (Director, Museum of Photography in Charleroi)
 Hélène Joubert (Curator, Musée du Quai Branly, Paris)
 Philippe Régnier (Editor-in-Chief, Daily Art)
 Guillaume Faroult (Louvre Museum)
 Pierre Jaubert (RMN Library, Louvre Museum)
 Florence Viguier (Director, Ingres Museum in Montauban)
 Eberhard Hinkel (Distributor, Interart, Paris)
 Hervé Lœvenbruck (Galerie Lœvenbruck, Paris)
 Chantal Herrmann (Editor-in-Chief, Paris Mômes)
 André Delpuech (Director Museum of Man, Paris)
 Bernard Benoliel (Cinémathèque française)
 Laurence Des Cars (Director, Musée de l'Orangerie in Paris)

2018

 Didier Brousse (Founder and Director Galerie Camera Obscura)
 Didier Ottinger (Director Centre Pompidou Paris)
 Alexandre Curnier (Director Noto Magazine)
 Samuel Hoppe (Director Volume artbook shop Paris)
 Pierre Samoyault (Director Interart Paris)
 Stéphane Corréard (Director at the Parisian art fair Galeristes)
 Alba Zamolo (Director youth artbook shop in the Louvre Museum Paris)
 Patricia Falguières (Teacher at EHESS)

2019

 Alba Zamolo (Director youth Artbooks shop in the Louvre Museum, Paris)
 Matthieu Conquet (Radio journalist at France Culture)
 Hélène Joubert (Curator, Musée du Quai Branly, Paris)
 Jean-Michel Frodon (Historian, critic, and cinema journalist)
 Samuel Hoppe (Director at the Volume library, Paris)
 Jean-Hubert Martin (Curator and former director of the Centre Pompidou Paris and Kunsthalle in Bern)

2020

 Alba Zamolo (Director youth Artbooks shop in the Louvre Museum, Paris)
 Matthieu Conquet (Radio journalist at France Culture)
 Hélène Joubert (Curator, Musée du Quai Branly, Paris)
 Jean-Michel Frodon (Historian, critic, and cinema journalist)
 Samuel Hoppe (Director at the Volume library, Paris)
 Stéphane Corréard (Director of the Parisian art fair Galeristes)
 Guillaume Kientz (Director of the Hispanic Society Museum, New-York)
 Sébastien Gokalp (Director at the Musée de l'histoire de l'immigration)

Jurys 
2012
 Catherine Millet, editor-in-chief of the art review art press and Honorary President of the jury
 Fabrice Hergott, director at Musée d'Art Moderne de la Ville de Paris
 Guillaume Houzé, sponsorship director in Galeries Lafayette Group
 Xavier Cannone, director at Photography Museum in  Charleroi
 Pierre Thoretton, filmmaker.

2013
 Robert Storr, art critic and Honorary President of the jury
 Jean-Paul Boucheny, filmmaker and producer
 Jennifer Flay,  director of the Fiac (Foire Internationale d’Art Contemporain, Paris)
 Line Ouellet, director at Musée national des beaux-arts du Québec 
 Éric de Chassey, director at the French Academy in Rome
 Laurent Le Bon, director at the Picaso Museum in Paris
 Marta Gili, director at Galerie nationale du Jeu de Paume in Paris.

2014
 Stéphane Corréard, director of the Contemporary art fair in Montrouge and Jury President
 Laure Flammarion, filmmaker
 Laurent Brancowitz, musician in the band Phoenix and collector
 Simon Baker, photography curator at the Tate Modern in London
 Luciano Rigolini, producer at Arte
 Patricia Falguières, art historian and president of the Centre national des arts plastiques.

2015
Albert Serra, Catalan filmmaker and Jury President
 Aurélien Bellanger, author, Prix de Flore 2014
 Dominique Païni, art critic and curator
 Anne Tronche, art critic
 Nazanin Pouyandeh, artist.

2016
> Book jury

 Jean-Hubert Martin, curator and Jury President
 Chiara Parisi, director of the cultural action at Monnaie de Paris
 Olivier Gabet, director at Musée des Arts Décoratifs, Paris
 Marco Velardi, editor-in-chief of the art and design review Apartamento.

> Film jury

Charles de Meaux, filmmaker, producer, co-founder at Ana Sanders Films and Jury President
 Catherine Derosier-Pouchous, producer for the film productions in Musée du Louvre, Paris
 Jean-Pierre Devillers, filmmaker
 Matthieu Copeland, curator and co-founder at Ana Sanders Films

 2017

> Book jury

 Nicolas Bourriaud, Director of the Montpellier Contemporain (MoCo) and President of the jury
 Florence Loewy, eponym gallery and library in Paris
 Grégoire Robinne, Fondator of Dilecta's editions
 Nicolas Daubanes, artist

>Film jury

 Clément Cogitore, movie director and President of the jury
 Colette Barbier, Directress of the Ricard business foundation
 Vicenç Altaió (ca), actor 
 Thomas Levy-Lasne, painter, author, actor and scenarist

2018

>Book jury

 Bernard Marcadé, art critic and expository commissioner
 Léa Bismuth, art critic and expository commissioner 
 Eric Mangion, director of the Art Center of the Arson Villa in Nice (Côte d'Azur)
 Arnaud Labelle-Rojaux, author and artist

>Film jury

 Cristian Mungiu, film director, scenarist, producer and President of the jury
 Virginie Jacquet, Directress of the gallery and the librairie du Jour agnès b
 Eduard Escoffet, poet
 Valérie Mréjen, novelist, videographer and visual artist
2019

>Book jury

 Marc Olivier Wahler (Director Museum, exhibition curator, and art critic)
 Thomas Clerc (Writer, columnist and performer)
 Alicia Kopf (Graduated in art and literature, multimedia artist and writer)
 Anne-Sarah Bénichou (Drector of the eponymous gallerr)
 Christoph Doswald (Publicist, curator, and university lecture)

>Film jury

 Joaquim Sapinho (movie director, producer, and artist)
 Morgane Tschiember (Director of the Calouste-Gulbenkian Museum)
 Penelope Curtis (director of the Calouste-Gulbenkian Museum)
 Abdelkader Benchamma (contemporary artist)

2020

>Book jury

 Bertrand Belin (Guitarist, singer, and writer)
 Frank Perrin (Philosopher, critic, review and magazines creator, photographer of post-capitalism)
 Cécile Debray (Director of the Musée de l'Orangerie, Paris)

>Film jury

 Lucie Rico (Director, scriptwriter, and novelist)
 Leopold Rabus (painter)
 Neil Beloufa (artist and movie director)

Guests of Honour 

 2012: Matali Crasset, Yves Michaud, Ferran Adrià, Werner Hoffman
 2013: Nathalie Heinich, Miquel Barceló
 2014: Joan Roca i Fontané
 2015: Philippe Djian
 2016: Michel Houellebecq, Matali Crasset, Julien Carreyn,  Enrique Vila-Matas,  Gérard Garouste
2018: Gilles Barbier, Nicolas Godin, Luke Rhinehart
2019: Yannick Haenel, Jacqueline Caux, Michael Blackwood, Fabrice Hyber, Raymond Pettibon, Collection Phares
2020: Bêka & Lemoine, Jean-Philippe Toussaint, Joan Fontcuberta, Phoenix, Olivier Assayas

Honor Price 

 2011 : Jean-Paul Boucheny
 2012 : Adrian Maben
 2013 : Juergen Teller
 2014 : Daniel Buren, André S. Labarthe, Roman Signer
 2015 : Sophie Calle, Agnès Varda, Alain Fleischer
 2016: Bertrand Lavier, Kenneth Goldsmith
 2017 : Jef Cornelis, Annette Messager, Jean-Michel Alberola, Jean-Yves Jouannais
2018 : Michel Auder, Pere Portabella, Alain Jaubert, Bruno Monsaingeon
2019: Raymond Pettibon, Aube Breton-Elléouët / Collections Phares, Jacqueline Caux, Michael Blackwood
2020: Bêka & Lemoine, Joan Fontcuberta, Jean-Philippe Toussaint

Expositions 

 2014 : Leopold Rabus - Till Rabus - Chad Moore - Arnaud Pyvka. Exposition collective, FILAF Galery, Perpignan
 2014 : Abdelkader Benchamma, Random, FILAF Galery, Perpignan
 2015 : Pascal Ferro, FILAF Galery, Perpignan
 2015 : Carlos Barrantes, FILAF Galery, Perpignan
 2015 / 2016 : Rodore, FILAF Galery, Perpignan
 2016 : Michel Houellebecq, Before Landing, Tiers-Ordre Chapel, Perpignan
 2016 : Carine Brancowitz - Faustine Cornette de Saint Cyr. Exposition collective, Galerie du FILAF, Perpignan
 2016 / 2017 : Cédric Torne, FILAF Galery, Perpignan
 2017 : David Lynch, Works on Paper, Tiers-Ordre Chapel, Perpignan
 2017 : Jean-Michel Alberola, Scénarios, FILAF Galery, Perpignan
 2017 / 2018 : Nicolas Daubanes, Sign of the Times, FILAF Galery, Perpignan
 2018 : Pierre et Gilles, Le Génie du Christianisme, Minimes Convent, Perpignan
 2018 : Alexandre Leger, Oeuvres Récentes, FILAF Galery, Perpignan
2019 : ALBEROlaBELLEROJOUX, Couvent des Minimes, Perpignan / Gilles Barbier, FILAF gallery, Perpignan
2020 : Till Rabus, Natures Mortes Acrobatiques, FILAF Galery, Perpignan / Toma Dutter, Alexis Gallissaires, Mathieu Legrand, Clara Claus, Max Wyse, Julien Laporte, Charles-Henry Sommelette, Quentin Spohn and others, Decameron, Centro Espagnol, Perpignan

Awards 

2011
Books
  Best African artbook : African Lace, a history of trade, creativity and fashion in Nigeria by Nath Mayo Adediran and Barbara Plankensteiner, Snoeck, Austria, 2010
  Best architecture book : CCCP - Cosmic Communist Constructions Photographed by Frédéric Chaubin, Taschen, Germany / France, 2011
  Best modern art book : Gérard Gasiorowski - Recommencer, commencer de nouveau la peinture by Thomas West, Frédéric Bonnet, Éric Mangion, Laurent Manœuvre and Erik Verhagen, Hajte Cantz, France / Germany, 2010
  Best contemporary art book : Monographie de Bernard Dufour by Fabrice Hergott, de la Différence, France, 2010
 Best fine art book  : Jacob Van Loo, 1614-1670 by David Mandrella, Arthena, France, 2011
  Best book about an art collection : Art and Activism : Projects of John and Dominique de Menil by Laureen Schipsi and Josef Helfenstein, Laureen Schipsi & Josef Helfenstein / The Menil Collection, USA, 2010
  Best artbook about the 19th Century : Jean-Léon Gerôme by Laurence des Cars, Édouard Papet and Dominique de Font-Réaulx, Skira / Flammarion, USA / France, 2010
  Best photography book  : Fénautrigues by Jean-Luc Moulène and Marc Touitou, La Table Ronde, France, 2010
  Best book about cinema : Opération Dragon de Robert Clouse by Bernard Benoliel, Yellow Now, Belgium, 2010
  Best design book : Campana Brothers, Complete Works (So Far) by Darrin Alfred, Deyan Sudjic, Li Edelkoort, Stephan Hamel and Cathy Lang Hö, Rizzoli / Albion, USA, 2010
  Best artbook for youth : Animaux à mimer by Alexandre Rodtchenko and Serguei Mikhaïlovitch Tretiakov, Memo, Russia / France, 2010
  "Grand Prix du jury" : African Lace, a history of trade, creativity and fashion in Nigeria by Nath Mayo Adediran and Barbara Plankensteiner, Snoeck, 2010, Austria

2012
Books
 Golden FILAF : Scrapbook - Gilles Caron by Marianne Caron-Montely, Lienart, France, 2012
 Silver FILAF : Saul Bass : A Life in Film & Design by Pat Kirkham and Jennifer Bass, Laurence King Publishing, England, 2011
 Special Jury Prize : Fritz Lang au travail by Bernard Eisenschitz, Phaïdon, Austria, 2011

Films
 Golden FILAF : Mendelsohn’s incessant visions by Duki Dror, 71 min, 2011 (Germany / Israel), prod. : Zigote Films
 Silver FILAF : Marina Abramovic, the artist is present by Matthew Akers, 1h46, 2012 (USA), prod. : Show of Force / HBO / MoMA
 Special Jury Prize : Jean-Olivier Hucleux by Virgile Novarina, 60 min, 2011 (France), prod. : a.p.r.è.s. productions / Virgile Novarina 
 « Coup de Cœur » Prize : Somewhere to disappear by Laure Flammarion and Arnaud Uyttenhove, 57 min, 2011 (France), prod. : MAS Films

2013

Books
 Golden FILAF ex-æquo : L'Art des années 60 by Anne Tronche, Hazan, France, 2012
 Golden FILAF ex-æquo : Gustav Klimt, Tout l’œuvre peint by Tobias G. Natter, Taschen
 Silver FILAF : Annales du cinéma français, les voies du silence, 1895-1929 by Pierre Lherminier, Nouveau Monde, France
 Special Jury Prize : Fully booked, ink on paper : Design & Concepts for New Publications by Andrew Losowsky, Gestalten

Films
 Golden FILAF ex-æquo : Le siècle de Cartier- Bresson by Pierre Assouline, 55 min, 2012 (France), prod. : Arte France / INA / Cinétévé / Henri Cartier-Bresson Foundation ;
 Golden FILAF ex-æquo : Sol LeWitt by Chris Teerink, 72 min, 2012 (Netherlands), coprod. : Doc.eye.film / AVRO télévision
 Silver FILAF : Dalí, génie tragi-comique by François et Stéphan Lévy-Kuentz, 52 min, 2012 (France), prod. : INA / Centre Georges Pompidou / AVRO / France 5 / RTBF / RAI educational / SBS
 Special Jury Prize : Hélio Oiticica by Cesar Oiticica Filho, 94 min, 2012 (Brasil), prod. Guerrilha Filmes

2014
Books
 Golden FILAF : Guy de Cointet by Frédéric Paul, Flammarion, France
 Silver FILAF : Peter Zumthor Buildings & Projects, 1985-2013 by Thomas Durisch and Peter Zumthor, Scheidegger et Spiess editions
 Special Jury Prize : Lalibela : capitale de l'art monolithe d'Éthiopie by Claude Lepage and Jacques Mercier, Picard editions, France

Films
 Golden FILAF : Tarr Béla, I used to be a filmmaker by Jean-Marc Lamoure, prod. MPM Film
 Silver FILAF : The Great Museum by Johannes Holzhausen, prod. Navigator Film
 Special Jury Prize : Haus Tugendhat by Dieter Reifarth, prod. Strandfilm et Pandora Film

2015

Books
 Golden FILAF : African modernism, The Architecture of Independence. Ghana, Senegal, Côte d'Ivoire, Kenya, Zambia by Manuel Herz, Park Books, Swiss, 2015
 Silver FILAF : Earthquakes, Mudslides, Fires & Riots: California & Graphic Design, 1936-1986 by Louise Sandhaus, Metropolis Books, USA, 2015
 Special Jury Prize : L'Industrie d'art romaine tardive by Alois Riegl, Christopher S. Wood and Emmanuel Alloa, Macula, France, 2014

Films
 Golden FILAF : Paul Sharits by François Miron, 85’, 2015 (Canada), prod : Filmgrafix Production
 Silver FILAF : ART WAR by Marco Wilms, 90’, 2014 (Germany), prod : Heldenfilm / ZDF / Arte / MFG Filmförderung Baden-Württemberg
 Special Jury Prize : Sobre la marxa by Jordi Morató 77’, 2014 (Spain), prod : La Termita Films / Universitat Pompeu Fabra

2016

Books
 Golden FILAF : Avant l'Avant-Garde. Du jeu en photographie, 1890-1940 by Clément Chéroux, Textuel, France, 2015
 Silver FILAF : Impondérable. The Archives of Tony Oursler by Tony Oursler, JRP Ringier / Fondation Luma, Swiss / France, 2015
 Special Jury Prize : Images Take Flight : Feather Art in Mexico and Europe by A. Russo, G. Wolf, D. Fane, Hirmer Publishers, Germany, 2016

Films
 Golden FILAF : Malpartida, Fluxus Village by Maria Perez, 2015 (Spain), prod : Smiz & Pixel, Agencia Audiovisual Freak
 Silver FILAF ex-aequo : Tony Conrad, completely in the present by Tyler Hubby, 2016 (USA), prod : Burning Bridges
 Silver FILAF ex-aequo : Action Space by Huw Wahl, 2016, (England), prod : Huw Wahl and Amanda Ravetz

 2017

Books

 Golden FILAF : Intimate Geometries: The Art and Life of Louise Bourgeois de Robert Storr, by Monacelli Press, United States, 2016
 Silver FILAF : Après Babel, traduire by Barbara Cassin, Actes Sud / MuCEM, France, 2016
 Special Jury Prize : Cedric Price Works 1952 - 2003 : A Forward-Minded Retrospective by Samantha Hardingham, Architectural Association Publications / Canadian Centre for Architecture, Angleterre / Canada, 2016
 Best youth art book : Why is Art Full of Naked People? : And other vital questions about art by Susie Hodge, Thames & Hudson, England, 2016
 Best book about art theory : Reset Modernity ! by Bruno Latour and Christophe Leclercq, Mit Press, United States, 2016
 Best photographic book : Zone de sécurité temporaire by Anne-Marie Filaire, Textuel, France, 2017
 Best fine art book : Les frères Le Nain, d'après les écrits de Jacques Thuillier by Serge Lemoine, Faton, France, 2016
 Best architecture book : Residential Towers by Annette Gigon, Guyer Mike, Felix Jerusalem, GTA, Switzerland, 2016
 Best graphism book : Histoire de l'écriture typographique, le XXè siècle (2 volumes) dir. Jacques André, Perrousseaux Atelier, France, 2016
 Best contemporary art book : Intimate Geometries: The Art and Life of Louise Bourgeois by Robert Storr, The Monacelli Press, United States, 2016
 Best modern art book : William N. Copley by Germano Celant, Fondazione Prada, The Menil Collection, Italy / United States, 2016
 Price of the youth book médiathèque of Perpignan : Draw Like an Artist: A Self-Portrait Sketchbook by Patricia Geis, Princeton Architectural Press, United States, 2016

Films

 Golden FILAF : Where is Rocky II ? by Pierre Bismuth (FR - ALL - IT - BELG), 93 min, 2016. Prod. : The Ink Connection / Vandertastic / Frakas Productions / In Between Art Film / Vivo Film
 Silver FILAF : Cinema Novo by Eryk Rocha (BR), 92 min, 2016. Prod. : Coqueirao Pictures / Aruac Filmes / Canal Brasil / FM Produçoes
 Special Jury Prize : Exprmntl by Brecht Debackere (BEL), 68 min, 2016. Prod. : Visualantics Production / Cinematek / RTBF / Canvas

2018

Books

 Golden FILAF : Philip Guston : Nixon Drawings. 1971 & 1975 by Musa Mayer and Debra Bricker Balken, Hauser & Wirth, Switzerland, 2017
 Silver FILAF: Architecture of Counterrevolution : The French Army in Northern Algeria by Samia Henni, gta Verlag, Switzerland, 2017
 Special Jury Prize : Guy de Cointet - Théâtre complet de Hugues Decointet, François Piron, Marilou Thiébault, Paraguay Press, France, 2017
 Best youth art book : 5 maisons de Dominique Ehrhard, Les grandes personnes, France, 2017
 Best book about art theory : Architecture of Counterrevolution : The French Army in Northern Algeria by Samia Henni, gta Verlag, Switzerland, 2017
 Best photographic book : Sally Mann, a thousand crossings by Sarah Kennel, Abrams, USA, 2018
 Best fine arts book : Johan Maelwael. Nijmegen - Paris - Dijon. Art around 1400  by Pieter Roelofs, Nai010, Neetherlands, 2017
 Best architecture book : Handbook of Tyranny by Theo Deutinger, Lars Muller, Switzerland, 2018
 Best contemporary art book : Le monde de Topor by Laurence Engel, Frédéric Pagak and alli., Les cahiers dessinés, France, 2017
 Best modern art book : Philip Guston : Nixon Drawings. 1971 & 1975 by Musa Mayer and Debra Bricker Balken, Hauser & Wirth, Switzerland, 2017
 Best primitive arts book : Maternité. Mères et enfants dans les arts d’Afrique by Herbert M. Cole, Fonds Mercator, Belgium, 2017
 Best music book : Ni noires, ni blanches : Histoire des musiques créoles, by Bertrand Dicale, éditions La Rue Musicale, France, 2017
 Best culinary arts : Kalamata : La cuisine, la famille et la Grèce by Martin Bruno and Julia Sammut, Editions Keribus, 2017

This prize was created in association with Maison Sales, Végétaux d'Art Culinaire.

 Prize of the youth book of the médiathèque de Perpignan : 5 maisons by Dominique Ehrhard, Les grandes personnes, France, 2017

Movies

 Golden FILAF : Moriyama-San by Louise Lemoine and Ila Bêka, 2017, 107' (FR). Prod. : Bêka & Partners
 Silver FILAF: Beuys by Andres Veil, 2017, 107’ (DE). Prod. : Zero one film in co-production, Terz Filmproduktion, SWR/ARTE, WDR
 Special jury prize: Une poétique de l'habiter by Caroline Alder and Damien Faure, 2018, 60' (FR). Prod. : Caroline Alder and Damien Faure. Film shown in world premiere.
2019

Books

 Golden FÌLAF: The birth of a Style Alteration Video, Fosbury Architecture Humboldt Books, Italie, 2018
 Silver FILAF: Jean-Jacques Lequeu : bâtisseur de fantasmes, L. Baridon, J-P Garric et alli. Norma / BnF, France, 2018
 Special jury prize: Pascale Ogier, Ma soeur, E. Nicolas, Filigranes Editions, France, 2018
 Youth category and Library Prize: Art'Bracadabra, découverte des ingrédients magiques de l'oeuvre d'art, R. Garnier, Amaterra / Centre Pompidou, France, 2018
 Cinema category: Zones de guerre, J. Saab, E. Sanbar, E. Adnan, editions de l'Oeil, France, 2018
 Photography category: The map and the territory, L. Ghirri, Mack Books, Allemagne, 2018.
 Food category: Manger à l'oeil, edition de l'Épure / Mucem, France, 2019
 Fine Arts category: Bruegel, Bill Traylor, V. Rousseau, D. Purden, 5 continents, Italie, 2018
 Architecture category: Group Ludic. L'imagination au pouvoir, X. de la Salle, D. Roditi, S. Koszel, Facteur Humain, Belgique, 2019
 Musique category: Art & Vinyl: a visual record, J. Fraenkel, A. De Beaupré. Fraenkel Gallery / éditions Antoine de Beaupré, USA / France, 2018
 Contemporary art category: Isidore Isou, F. Acquaviva, Edition du Griffon, Suisse 2019
 Primitive Arts category: Galerie Pigralle. Afrique, Océanie, 1930. Une exposition mythique, C-W. Hourdé, N. Rollan. Somogy Editions d'Art, France, 2018

Films

 Golden FILAF: That Cloud Never Left, Yashaswini Raghunandan, India, 2019, 65'. Prod: Namita Waiker, P.Sainath, Yashaswini Raghunandan
 Silver FILAF: Le Premier mouvement de l'immobile, Sebastiano d'Ayala Valva, France, Italy, 2018, 81'. Pro/diff: le films de la Butte, Ideacinama, Arte Geie, Radio France
 Special jury prize: Delphine et Carole Insoumuses, Callisto Mc Nulty, France, Switzerland, 2018, 68'. Prod: les films de la butte
 Special jury prize: Creation from the obscure, Tomoya Use, Japan, 2018, 59'. Pro: Nozomu Makino, Shinichi Ise, Hiroaki Fukushima, Toshihide Yabuki

2020

Books

 Golden FILAF: Alternative Histories, Marius Grootveld, Jantje Engels, Guus Kaandorp, Thomas Dank, Mathias Clottu, ed. Drawing Matter, 2019
 Silver FILAF: Journal d'un maître d'école. Le film, un livre, Vittorio de Seta, Federico Rossin, ed. Arachnéen, 2019
 Special jury prize: Nathalie Parain, Michèle Cochet, Michel Defourny and Claude-Anne Parmegiani, ed. MéMO, 2019
 Contemporary art category: Elizabeth Peyton: aire and angels, Elizabeth Peyton, Jules Esteves, Lucy Dahlsen, ed. National Portrait Gallery, London, 2019
 Fine arts category: Black in Rembrandt's time, Elmer Kolfin and Epco Runia, ed. W. BOOKS, 2020
 Primitive arts category: Striking Iron: the art of African blacksmiths, gathering of 18 authors, ed. Fowler Museum at UCLA, LA, 2020
 Music category: Jim Marshall: show me the picture - images and stories from a photography legend, Amelia Davis, ed. Chronicle Books, 2019
 Modern art category : object of desire - surrealism and design : 1924 - today, Mateo Kries, ed. Vitra Design Museum, 2019

Films

 Golden FILAF: Etre Jérôme Bel, Sima Khatami et Aldo Lee, 2019, 79'
 Silver FILAF: Palimpsest of the Africa museum, Matthias De Groof, 2019, 69'
 Special jury prize: The Poposal, Jill Magid, 2019, 83'
 Special jury prize: Book, paper, scissors, Hirose Nakano, 2019, 94'

FILAF Artbook Fair 

In 2016, the festival created the FILAF Artbook Fair. The first edition of this show was held from the 24th to 26 June 2016 in the Dominican church in Perpignan.

The FILAF Artbook Fair is a real meeting place for publishers and the general public. It offers an unprecedented panorama of contemporary editorial practices linking art and print: a book on art, a book of art, multiples, fanzines, catalogs, posters and unpublished projects.

The fair is a place of experimentation and freedom. Conferences, performances, signatures, readings, debates punctuate this new meeting in the presence of artists, public collection managers, printers, collectors, publishers, graphic designers and booksellers.

Publications: filaf annual review 

filaf annual is an annual magazine about artbooks and films. Richly illustrated, it develops an exploration of art through the prism of books and films. Starting from the attention paid by artists, historians, curators and the general public, the review is constructed as a representation of the mechanisms of production and the reception of these. Because in quantity as in quality, we know infinitely more works of art through our library and films than by their direct attendance. The world of art lives by the mechanism of the representation of art and by its actors and commentators. Deconstructing the ambiguous and fascinating link between art and modes of representation of art, the journal develops an approach to the history and actuality of books and films on the scholarly and in-depth art.

The journal consists in a selection of articles, interviews and original portfolios. At a time when the book becomes an instrument of determining power for artists, making or undoing careers, playing a significant economic role in exhibitions, remaining an unparalleled object of knowledge, the review witnesses its deep issues.

At a time when movies, television and the internet are producing video streaming and films that build the common representation of art, the magazine seeks to deconstruct the issues of the animated image dealing with art: Why? How? Who? Looking mainly at the margins of an international production sometimes formatted, it reflects the many and superb efforts that filmmakers still make to make sense to works of art.

filaf annual develops well-founded choices in the face of the worldwide production of books and films on art. It relies on critics, publishers, historians, professionals in the field and partners forming a drafting committee. The review presents a rigorous and informed selection.

The FILAF Gallery / Art Library 

Continuing its effort in favor of the written word, the FILAF inaugurated in June 2014, during the fourth edition of the festival, a space that is both gallery and art bookstore. Open year-round, it completes the regional offer by presenting temporary exhibitions of contemporary art. It invites selected artists to produce works combining literature, cinema and drawing. Through exhibitions, artist residencies and the production of associated micro-editions, the FILAF Gallery seeks to highlight the closed links that living artists have with literature and cinema. As exhibitions evolve, the exploration of a universe is constructed.

Continuing its effort in favor of writing, the bookstore offers magazines such as Artpress, The British Journal of Photography, ArtReview, Artforum, The Drawer, The Plat, Tapas or Etudes Photographiques.

The FILAF / Galeristes Award 

In 2016, the Filaf inaugurated the Filaf / Galeristes Prize, an award celebrating the best art book published by an art gallery. The event takes place during Galeristes, a contemporary art fair created in 2016 by French curator Stéphane Corréard. It has since its inception rewarded five books.

 2016, «Michel Parmentier, décembre 1965-20 novembre 1999, Une rétrospective», published by Galerie Loevenbruck, ex-aequo with «Cloaca Maxima, Ernest T.», published by Galerie Sémiose (Benoît Porcher).
 2017, «Re/productions» by Cyril Zarcone, published by Galerie Éric Mouchet. 
 2018, «Les Travaux et les jours» by Hélène Delprat, co-published by Éditions Dilecta & Galerie Christophe Gaillard, ex-aequo with «Cathryn Boch», Galerie Papillon. 
 2019, «Christian Berst Art Brut for X-Ray memories» Lindsay Caldicott. 
 2020, «Square Dance» by Nicolas Chardon, published by Connoisseurs.

References

External links

 Official Website
 FILAF video report
 Making-of FILAF 2017

Cultural festivals in France
Film festivals in France